DuPont Show of the Month was a 90-minute television anthology series that aired monthly on CBS from 1957 to 1961. The DuPont Company also sponsored a weekly half-hour dramatic anthology series hosted by June Allyson, The DuPont Show with June Allyson (1959–61).

During the Golden Age of Television, DuPont Show of the Month was one of numerous anthology series telecast between 1949 and 1962. Superficially, it resembled Playhouse 90 and other anthologies, but DuPont Show of the Month focused less on contemporary dramas and more on adaptations of literary classics, including Oliver Twist, The Prince and the Pauper, Billy Budd, The Prisoner of Zenda, A Tale of Two Cities and The Count of Monte Cristo.

Directors and writers
The directors for the series included Sidney Lumet, Ralph Nelson, Alex Segal and Robert Mulligan.

DuPont Show of the Month was the first anthology series to stage a television dramatization of Thornton Wilder's only novel, The Bridge of San Luis Rey. It also presented original dramas, such as The Lincoln Murder Case. Dale Wasserman wrote for the show, and it was Wasserman's I, Don Quixote on this series (November 9, 1959) that was eventually developed into Man of La Mancha six years later. The plot and much of the dialogue is identical. 

Other writers included Sidney Kingsley and Terence Rattigan.

Awards and actors
The show was nominated for a total of 12 Emmy Awards. John Gielgud, Gracie Fields, Richard Burton, Lee J. Cobb, Colleen Dewhurst, Eli Wallach, Hurd Hatfield, Judith Anderson, Hume Cronyn, Maureen O'Hara, Michael Rennie, Suzanne Storrs, Farley Granger, Fritz Weaver, and George C. Scott made appearances. Johnny Washbrook of the My Friend Flicka TV series appeared as Tom Canty in The Prince and the Pauper.

With its stage cast, DuPont Show of the Month telecast the 1958 Old Vic production of William Shakespeare's Hamlet immediately following its brief run on Broadway. Sally Benson's Junior Miss, on Broadway from 1941 to 1943 came to television on December 20, 1957, as a production of DuPont Show of the Month. Carol Lynley had the lead role of Judy Graves with Don Ameche and Joan Bennett as her parents and Susanne Sidney as Fuffy Adams. Others in the cast were Diana Lynn, Paul Ford, Jill St. John and David Wayne.

Episodes
In February 1960, the program presented "Ethan Frome", with Sterling Hayden, Julie Harris, and Clarice Blackburn.

References

External links

DuPont Show of the Month at CVTA with episode list

1957 American television series debuts
1961 American television series endings
1950s American anthology television series
1960s American anthology television series
1950s American drama television series
1960s American drama television series
Black-and-white American television shows
CBS original programming
DuPont
English-language television shows
Television series by Talent Associates